Hofer Island is a small island in Beaverlodge Lake, northern Saskatchewan, Canada.

References

Uninhabited islands of Saskatchewan
Lake islands of Saskatchewan